Xanthoarctia is a genus of moths in the family Erebidae.

Species
Xanthoarctia pseudameoides

References
Natural History Museum Lepidoptera generic names catalog

Phaegopterina
Moth genera